Sinocyclocheilus yaolanensis is a species of ray-finned fish in the genus Sinocyclocheilus.

References 

yaolanensis
Fish described in 2009